Eliza Bennett (born 17 March 1992) is an English actress and singer. Her most notable roles have been those of Meggie Folchart in the film Inkheart, Tora in the film Nanny McPhee, Susan in From Time to Time and Holly Manson in the West End musical Loserville. Bennett starred on the MTV black comedy series Sweet/Vicious as Jules Thomas. In 2021, Bennett began playing Amanda Carrington in the CW series Dynasty.

Early and personal life
Bennett was born and grew up in Reading, Berkshire with her older brother and sister and attended Leighton Park School.

Career

Film
Bennett landed her first role as Jemima in Chitty Chitty Bang Bang at the London Palladium in 2002 aged nine. She got her first film role playing Princess Arabella in 2004's The Prince & Me. In 2005 Bennett landed one of her biggest film roles, playing Tora in Nanny McPhee.

In 2005, she played Hayley in the TV movie Supernova, Young Anne in the 2006 film Victims, Emily in The Contractor with Wesley Snipes and television work as Nora in the Agatha Christie's Marple episode "By the Pricking of My Thumbs".

In 2006, Bennett played the role of Meggie Folchart in the film Inkheart, based on the novel by Cornelia Funke. In 2009, she went on to land the role of Susan in Julian Fellowes' film From Time to Time.

In 2010, Bennett played the role of Kate Anderson in Johannes Roberts' thriller film F, and appeared in Roadkill in 2011. In 2012, she portrayed the psychopathic character of Kayleigh in the thriller film Confine; a role for which she received a best supporting actress nomination at the Wild Rose Independent Film Festival, eventually receiving a distinctive achievement award. and also winning Best Actress Award for Confine at CYIFF 2013

In 2012 she played the role of Kayleigh in the film Confine, Alex/Brittany in the 2015 film H8RZ and Agathe Von Trapp in the 2015 film The von Trapp Family: A Life of Music.

From 2016 to 2017, Bennett starred as Jules Thomas in Sweet/Vicious. In 2021, she began playing Amanda Carrington in the CW series Dynasty.

Music 
Bennett performed a song for Inkheart soundtrack, called "My Declaration", originally written and performed by Tom Baxter.

In 2012, Bennett went back to musical theatre when she was cast as Holly in the West End musical Loserville. This was first performed at the West Yorkshire Playhouse in Leeds, before getting a West End transfer to the Garrick Theatre in 2012.

Bennett released her new EP "Late Twenties" in November 2022.

Filmography

Discography

Extended plays

Singles

Other appearances

Music videos

Theatre

Awards and nominations

References

External links
 

1992 births
English child actresses
English film actresses
English television actresses
Living people
actors from Reading, Berkshire
People educated at Leighton Park School
English stage actresses
Actresses from Berkshire
21st-century English actresses
21st-century English women singers
21st-century English singers